SCSO may refer to: 

Santa Rosa County Sheriff's Office
Sarasota County Sheriff's Office
Seminole County Sheriff's Office
South Carolina Science Olympiad
Story County Sheriff's Office (Iowa)
Sumter County Sheriff's Office (Florida)